Dowzahir (also Romanized as Dowzahīr, Dozair, and Dūzahīr) is a village in Howmeh Rural District, in the Central District of Semnan County, Semnan Province, Iran. At the 2006 census, its population was 102, in 47 families.

References 

Populated places in Semnan County